Etlingera cevuga is a monocotyledonous plant species that was first described by Berthold Carl Seemann, and given its current name by Rosemary Margaret Smith. Etlingera cevuga is part of the genus Etlingera and the family Zingiberaceae. No subspecies are listed in the Catalog of Life.

References 

cevuga
Taxa named by Rosemary Margaret Smith